Barry Railway Class F were  steam saddle tank engines of the Barry Railway in South Wales.  They were designed by J. H. Hosgood and built by a number of British companies.

Shunting at the Docks
The purpose of this locomotive was to carry out heavy shunting duties at Barry Docks.  They were, in effect, a saddle tank version of the class "A", a locomotive which had carried out shunting duties at the docks up to this point.  28 engines of the class "F" were manufactured, making it the second largest class of locomotive used on the Barry Railway, outnumbered only by the "B1" class.  They were fitted with a reversing lever, far quicker for changing direction during shunting duties than the customary screw type reverser.  They were all shedded at Barry and occasionally, in addition to their main shunting duties, they worked goods and coal traffic on the main line.

Withdrawal
The locomotives passed to the Great Western Railway in 1922 but were withdrawn between 1926 and 1936.  However so useful were the engines, that many of them were sold on, details of which are listed below.  None survived into British Railways ownership and none have been preserved.

Numbering

Disposals

References

F
0-6-0ST locomotives
Sharp Stewart locomotives
Vulcan Foundry locomotives
NBL locomotives
Hudswell Clarke locomotives
Railway locomotives introduced in 1890
Scrapped locomotives
Standard gauge steam locomotives of Great Britain
Shunting locomotives